John Trevor Fahey (born January 4, 1944) is a Canadian retired professional ice hockey left winger who played in one National Hockey League game for the New York Rangers during the 1964–65 season. The rest of his career, which lasted from 1964 to 1974, was spent in the minor leagues.

Playing career
Fahey was assigned to the Tillsonburg Mavericks of the Western Ontario Hockey League for the 1960-61 season. He was called up at the end of the season to play with the Guelph Royals in the playoffs alongside the likes of future NHL players Rod Gilbert, Jean Ratelle, and Bob Plager.

Post-playing career
Following his playing career, Fahey published two hockey books entitled "All About Hockey" (1974) and "Hockey: Canadian/Soviet" (1977). He served as head coach of the Brandon Bobcats of the Great Plains Athletic Conference, leading team to a championship in 1975. He was later named athletic director at Brandon University. Fahey founded the Coach International Hockey Schools in Manitoba in 1980. He moved to Florida in 1995 and was instrumental in starting the Tampa Bay Raiders Minor Hockey Association.

In 2012, he was inducted into the Cape Breton Sports Hall of Fame during the Cape Breton Sport Heritage Awards ceremony at Centre 200. He currently resides in Tampa Bay and continues to coach hockey.

Career statistics

Regular season and playoffs

See also
 List of players who played only one game in the NHL

References

External links
 

1944 births
Living people
Canadian expatriate ice hockey players in the United States
Canadian ice hockey left wingers
Denver Spurs (WHL) players
Des Moines Oak Leafs players
Guelph Royals players
Ice hockey people from Nova Scotia
Kitchener Rangers players
Minnesota Rangers players
New York Rangers players
New York Rovers players
Omaha Knights (CHL) players
People from New Waterford, Nova Scotia
Sportspeople from the Cape Breton Regional Municipality
Toledo Blades players